Caffeine use for sport is a worldwide known and tested idea. Many athletes use caffeine as a legal performance enhancer, as the benefits it provides, both physically and cognitively outweigh the disadvantages. The benefits caffeine provides influences the performance of both endurance athletes and anaerobic athletes. Caffeine has been proven to be effective in enhancing performance. Below is more detail on who benefits more, trained athletes in comparison to untrained, males in comparison to females and aerobic vs anaerobic athletes.

Caffeine is a stimulant drug. Once consumed, it is absorbed in the stomach and small intestine as well as being circulated throughout the body. It targets muscles and organs, in particular the brain.  
Caffeine is most commonly known for being in coffee. It is also found in tea, chocolate, soft drinks, energy drinks and medications.

The short term effects from caffeine are usually noticed after 5–30 minutes and long term ones last for up to 12 hours.

Those who use caffeine regularly, most often drinking at least one coffee a day, can become dependent and addicted. If caffeine use for these people is stopped they may have withdrawals symptoms of feeling tired and headaches.



Benefits from caffeine

Physical 
Caffeine acts on both the respiratory system and cardiovascular system. The cardiovascular system is the pathway the human body uses for circulating blood, supplying oxygen and removing waste products. The respiratory system is the system involved with the exchange of oxygen, carbon dioxide and wastes between the atmosphere and the blood.

Physical benefits include bronchodilation. Caffeine also increases adrenaline levels in the blood system. Adrenaline, is commonly known as the 'flight-or-fight' hormone, so prepares the body for physical activity.

Via many of these physiological responses, the fatigue an athlete would normally feel is postponed, allowing physical activity to be sustained for longer and of a higher level. Discussed in more detail later, this is very beneficial to aerobic athletes, where delayed and suppressed fatigue will improve performance.

Cognitive 
As caffeine targets the brain there are many cognitive effects from using it.  Caffeine is a stimulant, so the cognitive benefits from it is that it can reduce tiredness and reaction time. Athletes are more alert and have feelings of more mental energy. Usually, sports that require a high amount of cognitive energy, such as darts, pool or chess, tend to correlate to a fine motor skill. In these areas, caffeine can assist by providing greater alertness and feelings of awareness. In gross motor skills, such as cricket batting, volleyball the cognitive aspects of these sports are improved by caffeine for greater awareness. Having a shortened reaction time is also highly beneficial for these sports, such as when the ball is travelling rapidly and a quick response is required to either block or dig the volleyball during a game.

Disadvantages from caffeine

Physical 
Caffeine is a mild diuretic, which can often lead to dehydration. Other physical disadvantages include, impaired fine motor control, observed via the shakiness of athlete's hands, gastrointestinal upset, increased heart rate and sleep disruptions. People often experience an increase in body temperature. This, on top of the initial rise in temperature due to exercise is disadvantageous, as the human body must work hard to cool the body, via systems such as sweating. Another disadvantage of caffeine is that it can become addictive and to those who don't have a coffee one day will feel edgy and tired, which will worsen their performance, should they be doing exercise.

Cognitive 
Caffeine can cause feelings of anxiety and insomnia. An athlete's regular sleep cycle is critical to their health. Studies have found that sleep deprivation has a significant effect on sub-maximal, prolonged exercise.  Caffeine also elevates stress hormone levels and one's perception of stress. As well as caffeine altering one's ability to sleep, the accumulation of increased levels of stress and anxiety result in greater levels of restlessness. Although these listed symptoms are cognitive and effect the mental aspect of performance or wellbeing they also lead on to effecting physical performance. Lack of sleep and stress reduces ones ability to perform at optimal level.

Effectiveness of caffeine 
Studies have found that typical doses of caffeine from 1–3 mg per kg of body weight will provide an effective improvement to performance. Previously, high doses were used such as 6 mg/kg, until recently lower doses supply the desired benefits with less consequences.

Caffeine has been proved to be effective for strength and endurance athletes, although greater responses have been gained for the endurance, aerobic athletes. This is because over the overarching benefit caffeine has for masking fatigue.

There is evidence that shows even though caffeine is effective for endurance and anaerobic activities, it is of greatest assistance to trained athletes. A sprint test using a sample of trained swimmers and untrained swimmers tested the differing effects of caffeine. Anaerobic capacity and blood lactate concentration were analysed. Only the trained swimmers increased their velocity after caffeine ingestion, with the p value showing significance. Hence, summaries show that caffeine is proven to be effective in providing metabolic adaptions with those who have specific training in the chosen sport.

J. Temple and A. Ziegler wrote studies that determined the differing effects of caffeine on genders. Males showed greater positive responses, with greater decreases in heart rate after caffeine than females. As well as females showed greater increases in diastolic blood pressure.

Endurance athletes 
Endurance athletes have been reported to use caffeine. The benefits caffeine provides may be especially important for low arousal situations. Where a sustained response is required, such as endurance marathons, caffeine improves performance.

Caffeine, when circulating through the body breaks down body fat. The body then has the ability to use free fatty acids as a primary fuel source. This is advantageous for endurance athletes as the process called glycogen storing occurs. Lower intensity exercise predominantly uses fat as a fuel source, hence caffeine improves this process. Glucose can be stored as glycogen for later bursts of intense activity. Glycogen sparing is most crucial for the first 15 minutes of the race, so caffeine is likely to be consumed a few hours prior to the event in order to achieve optimal results.

For example, a marathon runner requires energy for 4 to 5 hours. They go through periods of low intensity sustained exercise, in which the predominant energy source is fats. Carbohydrates are also used but are more beneficial if they are stored to use later, nearing the end of the race, hence caffeine improves this glycogen storing process. Marathon runners must also maintain alertness and energy during the long race. For this reason supplements, such as sports gels are advised and consumed during the race. Typical sports gels contain 26g of carbohydrates with energy boosting caffeine. The benefits, discussed earlier, both cognitive and physically are critical to these athlete's peak performance.

Anaerobic athletes 

Anaerobic exercise includes sprinting, weightlifting, and long jump. Epinephrine or adrenaline levels being increased stimulates the body for extreme physical application. This is highly beneficial for anaerobic, high intensity exercise such as these events.

In studies of trained males the discovery of the optimal amount of caffeine for anaerobic exercise was determined. A caffeine dosage of 3–5 mg/kg may improve high-intensity sprint performance when consumed prior to exercise.

J Grgic, E. Trexler, B. Lazinca and Z. Pedisic reported on the testing of caffeine on muscle power and strength, both anaerobic activities. The analysis showed that there were small improvements, in which they discussed for these activities correlate to meaningful differences in performance.  The following conclusions were drawn:

 Caffeine ingested resulted in an increase in upper body strength but not lower body strength.
 For strength exercises, there was no significant differences between trained and untrained subjects
 Caffeine in capsule form had a greater influence on performance rather than liquid form, gums and gels were not tested.
 Using a vertical jump as an indicator of muscle power, results showed a significant increase in power, supporting caffeine as an effective ergogenic aid.

References 

Sports culture
Doping in sport